The Shoppes at Grand Prairie is an outdoor lifestyle center in Peoria, Illinois, United States, which opened in April 2003. It features Dick's Sporting Goods, Marshalls and many more stores. Original stores include Bergner's, Galyan's, Borders and Linens N Things.

History
Famous Dave's opened in 1996 and seven years later in 2003, The Shoppes at Grand Prairie held its grand opening with Bergner's and Galyan's. Also in 2003, AMC  Theatres opened along with the mall. In 2004, Steak N Shake opened in the surrounding area of the mall. In October of that same year, all Galyan's Store became Dick's Sporting Goods. In 2005, Buffalo Wild Wings opened to customers. In 2006, a strip plaza with a Gordmans and a Hy-Vee opened to the left of the mall. Also in 2006, LongHorn Steakhouse held its grand opening. In 2009, Old Chicago Pizza opened in front of the mall. That same year, all Linens N Things Store closed as part of bankruptcy, followed by Borders in 2011. City of Peoria HRT taxable retail sales fell during the recession, with sales recovering subsequently, reaching about $15 billion in 2013. H&M opened at The Shoppes at Grand Prairie on December 18, 2015.  In Late August 2018, Bergner's closed along with all Bon-Ton Locations because of Bankruptcy.

See also
 Northwoods Mall (Illinois)

References

External links
 

2003 establishments in Illinois
Buildings and structures in Peoria, Illinois
Lifestyle centers (retail)
Shopping malls established in 2003
Shopping malls in Illinois